Notre-Dame-de-Grâce (also known as Notre-Dame-de-Grâce—Lachine East) was a federal electoral district in Quebec, Canada, that was represented in the House of Commons of Canada from 1949 to 1997.

This riding was created in 1947. In 1980 its name was changed to "Notre-Dame-de-Grâce—Lachine East".

It was abolished in 1987 when it was redistributed into Lachine—Lac-Saint-Louis and a new Notre-Dame-de-Grâce riding.

The new Notre-Dame-de-Grâce riding was created from parts of Notre-Dame-de-Grâce—Lachine East, Mount Royal and Saint-Henri—Westmount ridings.

This riding consisted of:
 the towns of Saint-Pierre and Montréal-Ouest;
 that part of the Town of Montréal bounded as follows: commencing at the intersection of the northeasterly limit of the City of Côte-Saint-Luc and Queen Mary Road; thence, successively, the following lines and demarcations: Queen Mary Road; Circle Road Street to the right; Bridle Path Street; Bonavista Avenue; Côte-Saint-Luc Road; the limits of the Town of Westmount; Autoroute 20; Autoroute 15; the Lachine Canal; the limits of the towns of LaSalle, Montréal, Montréal-Ouest, Montréal, Hampstead; the limits of the city of Côte-Saint-Luc to the point of commencement.

The electoral district was abolished in 1996 when it was merged into Notre-Dame-de-Grâce—Lachine riding.

Members of Parliament

This riding elected the following Members of Parliament:

Election results

Notre-Dame-de-Grâce, 1949–1984

Notre-Dame-de-Grâce—Lachine East, 1984–1988

Notre-Dame-de-Grâce, 1988–1997

See also 

 List of Canadian federal electoral districts
 Past Canadian electoral districts

External links 
Riding history from the Library of Parliament:
 Notre-Dame-de-Grâce 1947-1980
Notre-Dame-de-Grâce—Lachine East 1981-1987
Notre-Dame-de-Grâce 1987-1996

Former federal electoral districts of Quebec